The Adventurers is a 2014 Russian adventure film directed by Konstantin Buslov.

The film's plot bears strong similarity to the 1967 film The Last Adventure.

Plot
Katya and Andrey arrive in Malta on the eve of their wedding and they coincidentally encounter Max in a diving center, a scuba diver and Katya's former fiancé. Max suggests that they all begin diving together. During one of the dives, Katya finds a fragment of a life jacket with the number of a German submarine from the time of the Second World War. After investigating, the guys find out that in 1942, members of the SS stole ancient Egyptian relics from the Maltese Order of Hospitallers, which should have been delivered to Germany. However the treasures failed to reach their destination. They decide that the drowned submarine must be somewhere around the Maltese beaches. Katya, Andrei and Max become immersed in the quest for treasure and a love triangle develops between them.

Cast
Konstantin Khabensky as Max
Svetlana Khodchenkova as Katya
Denis Shvedov as Andrei

Production
The picture was shot on location in Malta.

Svetlana Khodchenkova took courses on diving before the film. Konstantin Khabensky did scuba diving for many years.

During one scene Khabensky's gas cylinder was not filled with air which caused the actor to almost drown.

References

External links
 

Russian adventure films
2010s adventure films
Treasure hunt films
2010s Russian-language films